The Holyoke Paperweights were a professional minor league baseball team based in Holyoke, Massachusetts, USA, that played in the now defunct Connecticut League from 1903 to 1911.  From 1907 to 1911, they were also known as the Papermakers. The team won the league pennant of the 1905 and 1907 seasons. The Paperweights and Papermakers were preceded by the 1884 Holyoke team of the Massachusetts State Association.

In June 1911, the Connecticut League ejected the Northampton and Holyoke clubs for "failure to pay their debts."

References

Sports in Holyoke, Massachusetts
Defunct minor league baseball teams
Professional baseball teams in Massachusetts
1903 establishments in Massachusetts
1911 disestablishments in Massachusetts
Baseball teams established in 1903
Baseball teams disestablished in 1911
Connecticut League teams
Defunct baseball teams in Massachusetts